Blean Anson Calkins (August 11, 1921 in Marshalltown, Iowa - March 16, 2003 in Muscatine, Iowa) was a sports radio broadcaster for over 30 years. He was President of the National Sportscasters and Sportswriters Association (NSSA) 1978-1981, and served on the NSSA Board with such contemporaries as Curt Gowdy, Chris Schenkel, Keith Jackson and Ray Scott.

His birth was a difficult one, the attending doctor was credited with saving his life, so he was named in honor of Dr. Blean.

Calkins broadcast Iowa Hawkeyes basketball and football home games along with Iowa high school athletics on KWPC out of Muscatine for over 30 years.  Calkins also did morning drive sports on album rock 99 Plus through most of the 1980s.  Morning show host Andy Hammer dubbed it "Radio's biggest two minutes".

Awards
 Iowa Sportscaster of the Year award: 1969, 1974, 1975, 1976
 He received the News Media Award in 1982 from the Iowa High School Athletics Association
 Iowa High School Athletic Directors Association for Outstanding Contributions to High School Athletics.

Death
Blean Calkin died in his sleep at home March 16, 2003. He had been living with a heart ailment since suffering a massive heart attack in 1989.

1921 births
2003 deaths
American sports announcers
American sports radio personalities
People from Marshalltown, Iowa
People from Muscatine, Iowa